Syncephalastrum racemosum is a filamentous fungus.

Clinical significance
It can cause nail disease, especially in damaged nails and has been proposed as associated with Alzheimer's disease, though this work has been heavily criticized for methodological issues.

References

Zygomycota
Taxa named by Joseph Schröter